Cocorote is one of the 14 municipalities of the state of Yaracuy, Venezuela. The municipality is located in central Yaracuy, occupying an area of 135 km ² with a population of 35,668 inhabitants in 2001. The capital lies at Cocorote. 

The economy is based essentially on agriculture. However, the town has been experiencing rapid growth for twenty years with increased commercial services.

References

Municipalities of Yaracuy